During the 2006–07 German football season, Werder Bremen competed in the Bundesliga.

Season summary
Bremen finished in third this season, still good enough for Champions League qualification. The club also made it to the UEFA Cup semi-final before being eliminated in a 5-1 aggregate defeat to eventual runners-up Espanyol.

Players

First-team squad
Squad at end of season

Left club during season

Transfers

In
 Diego - FC Porto, May, €6,000,000
 Markus Rosenberg - Ajax, January 26
 Hugo Almeida - Porto, season-long loan
 Peter Niemeyer - FC Twente, January
 Christian Vander - VfL Bochum

Out
 Mohamed Zidan - Mainz, 17 January, €2,800,000
 Leon Andreasen - Mainz, January, season-long loan

Results

Champions League

Group stage

UEFA Cup

Round of 32

Werder Bremen won 4–3 on aggregate.

Round of 16

Werder Bremen won 3–0 on aggregate.

Quarter-final

Werder Bremen won 4–1 on aggregate.

Semi-final

Espanyol won 5–1 on aggregate.

References

Notes

SV Werder Bremen seasons
Werder Bremen